Charles A. Martin served as the Chief Scout of the Boy Scouts of South Africa and also International Commissioner of the Scout Association of Rhodesia, which has since become the Scout Association of Zimbabwe.

In 1983, Martin was awarded the 165th Bronze Wolf, the only distinction of the World Organization of the Scout Movement, awarded by the World Scout Committee for exceptional services to world Scouting.

References

External links

Recipients of the Bronze Wolf Award
Year of birth missing
Scouting and Guiding in Zimbabwe
Scouting and Guiding in South Africa